The Maha Handball Super League is the Premier Men's
professional Handball League in Maharashtra, administered
by the Handball Association of Maharashtra under aegis of Handball Federation of India. It was founded in February 2016.

Format
The Maha Super League will have in all 6 teams. The Maha Super League will be played on the Round Robin basis wherein each team will play 5 matches each. 
The game duration will be 40 minutes played in 4 quarters.

The Maha Super League will be played as per the rules and regulations of International Handball Federation and as adapted by HFI.

Current season
Teams for Season 2015-16

Winners by season

References

External links
  Official website

Maha Super League
Sports leagues in India